Omsk Popov Production Association is a company based in Omsk, Russia. It is part of the Belarus-based Interstate Development Corporation.

The Omsk Popov Radio Plant is an important Russian developer of advanced communications systems, including mobile systems, for military and civil use. Production includes the "Malyutka" and "Azid" families of radio relay and radiotelephone stations for setting up local telephone communication lines and for local communications in the areas of transport, power systems, petroleum, gas pipelines, etc. The Omsk Popov Radio Plant also produces telescopic antenna masts.

References

External links
 Official website

Manufacturing companies of Russia
Companies based in Omsk
Ministry of the Communications Equipment Industry (Soviet Union)
Electronics companies of the Soviet Union